The Peter Mortell Holder of the Year Award (or HOTY) is a tongue-in-cheek, informal award given to the top holder in college football in the United States.

History
The award was created in 2015 by its first recipient, Peter Mortell. At the time, Mortell was a punter in his senior year at Minnesota. During his career at Minnesota, Mortell handled all punting and holding duties over three seasons. Off the field, Mortell (as well as other specialists at Minnesota and around the Big Ten) was known for his sense of humor, which manifested in the award's parodist nature. The comedic nature of the award garnered national attention and his joking acceptance video was included by ESPN in their yearly award show for more serious college football position awards.

Winners
Each year's finalists and winner is selected by the award's Foundation, which is run by Mortell. For the winner, a foundation is set up to help raise money for a charity of his choosing. As the inaugural winner, Mortell raised approximately $30,000 for the University of Minnesota Children's Hospital. Additionally, each winner records a comedic acceptance video which is shown during ESPN's award show.

References

External links
 

College football national player awards
Awards established in 2015
2015 establishments in the United States